In Enemy Country is a 1968 American war film directed by Harry Keller and starring Anthony Franciosa, Anjanette Comer and Guy Stockwell. The film's art direction was by John Beckman and Alexander Golitzen.

Plot
During World War II a group of Allied agents are sent on a secret mission to German-occupied France to destroy a dangerous new weapon.

Cast

Bibliography
 Jay Jorgensen. Edith Head: The Fifty-year Career of Hollywood's Greatest Costume Designer. Running Press, 2010.

See also
List of American films of 1968

References

External links
 

1968 films
1968 war films
American war films
Films directed by Harry Keller
Universal Pictures films
Films set in France
American World War II films
Films scored by William Lava
Films about the French Resistance
Films with screenplays by Edward Anhalt
1960s English-language films
1960s American films